The Empire Buildings , also often referred to as the Empire Building, are a group of heritage listed buildings on the corner of Stirling Terrace and York Street overlooking Princess Royal Harbour in Albany in the Great Southern region of Western Australia.

The buildings were constructed in 1912, and once comprised a group of shops and a cinema. The buildings have elements of Federation Free Style architectural design such as asymmetry and use of two contrasting building materials of brick and cement render.

Replacing a single storied bungalow structure that faced York Street, the Empire theatre was designed by architect Tom Anthoness and was built by J. Ashman and Warner. Initially the building held a theatre and shops. The theatre was able to hold 1,000 people. The theatre cost £5,000 and was owned and operated by West's Picture Company. It boasted refreshment stalls, a winter garden for ladies and a spacious dress circle.

Features of the two storey building include a corner entrance, asymmetrical facade, parapet wall concealing roof, informal groupings of windows, gabled pediment and decorative skyline features.

In 2000 a portion of the building was converted to a nightclub. It was closed for some time and reopened to include a bar on the ground floor in 2006.

See also
 List of places on the State Register of Heritage Places in the City of Albany

References

1912 establishments in Australia
Heritage places in Albany, Western Australia
Stirling Terrace, Albany
York Street, Albany, Western Australia
State Register of Heritage Places in the City of Albany